James Edmund Jeffries (June 1, 1925 – August 22, 1997) was a U.S. Representative from Kansas from 1979 to 1983.

Born in Detroit, Michigan, Jeffries attended the public schools. He graduated from Cranbrook School, Bloomfield Hills, Michigan, 1943.
He attended Michigan State University, Lansing, 1947. He served in the United States Army Air Corps from 1943 to 1945. and was an investment counselor and corporate director from 1956 to 1979. He served as a delegate to the Kansas State Republican convention, 1978.

Jeffries was elected as a Republican to the Ninety-sixth and to the Ninety-seventh Congresses (January 3, 1979 – January 3, 1983). He was a conservative. He introduced 14 bills during his tenure, the most prominent of which was a 1981 law which settled a long-standing controversy over a minor border dispute between Missouri and Kansas

He was not a candidate for reelection in 1982 to the Ninety-eighth Congress and was a resident of Atchison, Kansas until he retired to Tucson, Arizona, where he died.

Notes

References

1925 births
1997 deaths
Politicians from Detroit
Military personnel from Detroit
People from Atchison, Kansas
Michigan State University alumni
Cranbrook Educational Community alumni
Businesspeople from Kansas
United States Army Air Forces personnel of World War II
Republican Party members of the United States House of Representatives from Kansas
20th-century American businesspeople
20th-century American politicians
Arizona Republicans